The 2022 OFC Champions League knockout stage will be played from 14 to 17 August 2022. A total of four teams will compete in the knockout stage to decide the champions of the 2022 OFC Champions League.

Qualified teams
The winners and runners-up of each of the two groups in the group stage advanced to the semi-finals.

Format
The four teams in the knockout stage played on a single-elimination basis, with each tie played as a single match at Ngahue Reserve.

Schedule
The schedule of each round was as follows.

Bracket
The bracket was determined as follows:

</onlyinclude>

Semi-finals

Final
In the final, the two semi-final winners played each other. The final will be played on 17 August 2022.

References

External links
OFC Champions League 2022, oceaniafootball.com

3
August 2022 sports events in New Zealand